Kostantyn Heorhiovych Novytsky, better known as Kost' Novytsky (December 26, 1950 in Kyiv, Ukrainian SSR (Now Ukraine)) is a Merited Artist of Ukraine and one of the more influential bandurists in Kyiv today.

Originally, he studied under Andriy Omelchenko and later at the Kyiv Conservatory under Serhiy Bashtan. After completing his studies, he was one of the founders of the pop group Kobza and was one of its soloists. Later, he formed a duo with fellow bandurist Volodymyr Kushpet. In 1985, Kost' Novytsky recorded a solo record of instrumental bandura music on the Melodiya label. In the late 1980s, Novytsky worked as an instrumental soloist with the Kyiv Bandurist Capella.

Currently he teaches bandura at the Kyiv Conservatory.

References

External links 
 Broadcast of Kostantyn Novytsky teaching and discussing the bandura by the Ukrainian Government television channel "Kultura" in 2010. 

This article is based on a translation of an article from the Ukrainian Wikipedia.

Kobzarstvo
Bandurists
Ukrainian musicians
Living people
20th-century Ukrainian musicians
21st-century Ukrainian musicians
Year of birth missing (living people)